Little Tougas is a Canadian comedy-drama film, directed by Jean-Guy Noël and released in 1976. The film stars Claude Maher as Rémi Tougas, a musician who is hiding out in the Magdalen Islands with his girlfriend Odette (Micheline Lanctôt) after stealing his band's payment from a gig; they plan to further escape to California with Odette's friend Gilberte (Suzanne Garceau), but their plans are complicated when Rémi's bandmate Martin (Gilbert Sicotte) arrives to recover the money.

The cast also includes Louise Forestier, Jean-Louis Millette, Guy L'Écuyer and Gabriel Arcand.

Carmel Dumas of Cinema Canada praised the film, writing that it demonstrated "that a very good young cinema is hard on the heels of the Carles and the Jutras of Quebec's film community."

The film won the Prix L.-E.-Ouimet-Molson from the Association québécoise des critiques de cinéma.

References

External links

1976 films
1976 comedy-drama films
Canadian crime comedy-drama films
Quebec films
Films shot in Quebec
Films set in Quebec
1970s French-language films
French-language Canadian films
1970s Canadian films